Vernon Wa Lon Wong  is a Macanese footballer who plays as a defender for G.D. Lam Pak.

International goals

References 

Living people
1989 births
Macau footballers
Macau international footballers
G.D. Lam Pak players
Association football defenders
Liga de Elite players